Hans Werner Ballmann (known as Werner Ballmann; born 11 April 1951) is a German mathematician. His area of research is differential geometry with focus on geodesic flows, spaces of negative curvature as well as spectral theory of Dirac operators

Ballmann earned his doctorate from the University of Bonn in 1979, under the supervision of Wilhelm Klingenberg.
He currently is a professor at the University of Bonn, and the managing director of the Max Planck Institute for Mathematics in Bonn, Germany, since 2007. He has advised 16 doctoral students at Bonn, including Christian Bär and Anna Wienhard.

He is a member of the German Academy of Sciences Leopoldina since 2007, and a member of the scientific committee of the Mathematical Research Institute of Oberwolfach since 2004.

Selected works
Lectures on spaces of non positive curvatures (PDF; 818 kB), DMV Seminar, Birkhäuser 1995
Spaces of non positive curvature, Jahresbericht DMV, vol. 103, 2001, pp. 52–65
Der Satz von Lusternik und Schnirelmann, Bonner Mathematische Schriften, vol. 102, 1978, pp. 1–25
 
 
 with M. Brin: Orbihedra of nonpositive curvature. Publications Mathématiques de l'IHÉS No. 82 (1995), 169–209 (1996).

References

External links 
Homepage at MPIM
 Author profile in the database zbMATH

Living people
20th-century German mathematicians
21st-century German mathematicians
1951 births
University of Bonn alumni
Academic staff of the University of Bonn
Academic staff of ETH Zurich
Max Planck Institute directors